Seeking Asylum is a 1979 Italian comedy film directed by Marco Ferreri. It was entered into the 30th Berlin International Film Festival where it won the Silver Bear - Special Jury Prize.

Plot
Benigni plays Roberto, a kindergarten teacher who uses unusual teaching methods to form special bonds with his students.

Cast
 Roberto Benigni as Roberto
 Francesca De Sapio as Chiara
 Dominique Laffin as Isabella
 Luca Levi as Luca
 Girolamo Marzano as Mario
 Carlo Monni as Paolo
 Chiara Moretti as Irma
 Roberto Amaro as Robertino

References

External links

1979 films
1979 comedy films
1970s Italian-language films
Italian comedy films
Films set in Emilia-Romagna
Films set in Sardinia
Films directed by Marco Ferreri
Films with screenplays by Gérard Brach
Films scored by Philippe Sarde
Silver Bear Grand Jury Prize winners
1970s Italian films